Sunten Electric Equipment Co., Ltd. is a S.A. manufacturing corporation of the People's Republic of China, founded in 1988 that specializes in electrical equipment for the power grid including  cast resin dry-type transformers, pre-fabricated substations, package substations, combined transformers, and switchgears. Its logo is composed with three intersecting chevrons with the three broad ends of their stripes opening skywards.

History
In 1988 Shunde Special Transformer Works was founded in Shunde, Guangdong, China. Shunde Special Transformer Works designed and produced the first cast-resin thin-insulation transformer of China in 1989 and was designated as the Nation's High-Tech Enterprise by the National Science Committee.

Awards
Outstanding Supplier for Three Gorges Project
2001 Manufacture of Machinery Industry in China
Management Model Enterprise of Statel Mechanical Industry Bureau
Promise-Keeping Certificate
Promise-Keeping Certificate for Last Ten Years
Guangdong Provincial User Satisfied Product Certificate
The Certificate for Key State Torch Planning Project
State Predominant New Product of Dry Type Transformer
Credible High & New Technology Enterprise Certificate
Statel High & New Technology Enterprise Certificate
Guangdong Famous Brand Certificate
Guangdong Name Brand Product Certificate
Top 10 Chinese Brand for Electrical Equipment Certificate
The First of Quality satisfaction and Brand Popularity
95 National Technology Reconstruction Outstanding Project in Dry Type Rectifying Transformer
WYBF1-35/10(6) Unmanned Prefabricated Substation
The Most Famous Brand in the Transformer Industry
Outstanding Supplier for State Electric Power Distribution Center Model Project
Outstanding Supplier of Line 2# of Guangzhou Metro Subway Project

References

Manufacturing companies of China